Myszyniec  is a town in Ostrołęka County, Masovian Voivodeship, northeastern Poland, with 3,032 inhabitants (2004).

History
Myszyniec was founded in 1654 by the Jesuits in accordance with a royal privilege issued by King John II Casimir Vasa. It was located in the Masovian Voivodeship in the Greater Poland Province of the Polish Crown. In 1708, the local Kurpie led by regional Polish folk hero Stach Konwa defeated the invading Swedes during the Great Northern War. In 1719, King Augustus II the Strong established annual fairs and weekly markets in Myszyniec. It was granted town rights in 1798.

In August 1920, Poles defeated the invading Soviets in the Battle of Myszyniec.

In the first days of the German invasion of Poland, which started World War II, on September 1–4, 1939, it was the site of fierce Polish defense, however, it eventually fell to Nazi Germany, which then occupied the town until 1945.

Cuisine
The officially protected traditional dish of Myszyniec are pierogi with blueberries, often served with smetana or honey (as designated by the Ministry of Agriculture and Rural Development of Poland).

Sport
The local football team is Bartnik Myszyniec. It competes in the lower leagues.

Notable people
 Władysław Skierkowski, (1886–1941) Polish priest

See also 
 Kurpie

References

External links
 Jewish Community in Myszyniec on Virtual Shtetl

Cities and towns in Masovian Voivodeship
Ostrołęka County
1654 establishments in the Polish–Lithuanian Commonwealth
Populated places established in 1654
Masovian Voivodeship (1526–1795)
Łomża Governorate
Warsaw Voivodeship (1919–1939)